Cornford is an English surname. It may refer to:
 Adam Cornford, an American poet, librettist, and essayist
 Christopher Cornford, a British artist and writer. 
 F. M. Cornford, an English classical scholar and poet
 Frances Cornford, an English poet
 Holly Cornford, ice hockey player
 James Cornford, English first-class cricketer
 John Cornford, an English poet and communist
 Tich Cornford, an English cricketer